is a passenger railway station located in the city of  Funabashi, Chiba Prefecture, Japan, operated by the private railway operator Shin-Keisei Electric Railway.

Lines
Futawamukōdai Station is served by the Shin-Keisei Line, and is located 16.3 kilometers from the terminus of the line at Matsudo Station.

Station layout 
The station consists of two opposed side platforms.

Platforms

History
Futawamukōdai Station was opened on March 16, 1949.

Passenger statistics
In fiscal 2018, the station was used by an average of 17,677 passengers daily.

Surrounding area
 Funabashi City Yakigaya Junior High School
 Funabashi Municipal Sakigaoka Elementary School
 Funabashi Municipal Yakigaya Elementary School

See also
 List of railway stations in Japan

References

External links

  Shin Keisei Railway Station information

Railway stations in Japan opened in 1949
Railway stations in Chiba Prefecture
Funabashi